Athar Ali may refer to:

 Athar Ali (politician) (born 1961), Pakistani Norwegian politician
 Athar Ali (scientist) (1963–2003), Pakistani system engineer and rocket scientist
 M. Athar Ali (1925–1998), Indian historian of Medieval Indian History
Moulana Athar Ali (1891–1976) Pakistani/Bangladeshi Islamist.